is a single released by Gackt on May 25, 2005 under Nippon Crown. It peaked at second place on the Oricon weekly chart and charted for thirteen weeks. In 2005, it was the 62nd best selling single of the year, with sales of 156,709 copies, making it to be Gackt's fourth best selling single. Both, A-side and B-side are also featured in the Mobile Suit Zeta Gundam movie Heir to the Stars. The music video combines footage from the anime with live-action sequences of Gackt piloting in a UC 0093 (Char's Counterattack era) spacesuit and linear seat (a type of cockpit setup in the Gundam series). It was certified gold by RIAJ.

Track listing

References

2005 singles
Gackt songs
2005 songs
Songs written by Gackt